Backbone is an American technology company located in Vancouver, Washington. The company specializes in consumer electronics and computer software products for gaming on Apple iOS devices. Backbone operates the Backbone app, a social and content creation hub for mobile devices.

History 
Backbone began as a startup by founder and CEO Maneet Khaira in the summer of 2018 while working at Google. Khaira sought to develop a more cohesive way to play games on mobile platforms. The company financed the production of its first product, Backbone One, through investments from MrBeast, Preston Arsement, Kwebbelkop, Typical Gamer, Night Media, Nadeshot, and Ludlow Ventures, as well as Ashton Kutcher and Guy Oseary’s Sound Ventures. Backbone revealed the Backbone One controller on October 27, 2020 and made it immediately available for purchase via limited drops.

In September 2021, Apple announced the iPhone 13 Pro and Pro Max models featuring larger camera units. While the Backbone One was still compatible with the new models, some users voiced a desire for a more comfortable fitment. Backbone announced that players could order an optional adapter for their device and released a free open-source 3D printable file for users to print at home within days of the iPhone release.

In November 2021, Backbone launched the Backbone+ service. The service gives users access to premium software features of the Backbone app, including the ability to stream to Twitch, enhanced recording options, and Xbox app integrations. The service offers users in-app perks such as free trials to Xbox Game Pass Ultimate and Google Stadia.

On February 23, 2022, Backbone announced it had raised $40 million in its Series A funding round led by Index Ventures. Other notable contributors to the round include Jason Citron (Discord), Nick Fajt (Rec Room), Patrick Spence (Sonos), The Weeknd, Kevin Hart, Amy Schumer, Sound Ventures, and Nico Wittenborn’s Adjacent.

Partnerships 
In March 2021, Backbone partnered with Nvidia to integrate their cloud gaming service GeForce Now with the Backbone platform and listed Backbone One as a recommended device for the service.

In June 2021, the company partnered with Microsoft to bring Xbox Cloud Gaming to iOS devices. The Backbone One controller was added to the designed for Xbox partner hardware program and is available for purchase from the Microsoft Store. The packaging for the Backbone One was redesigned with Xbox branding.

In October 2021, Backbone partnered with Iconfactory to bring exclusive Backbone-themed in-game cosmetics to the Apple Arcade exclusive second installment of the Frenzic series, Frenzic: Overtime. Players who connect a Backbone One controller to play the game will receive an alternate version of DoBot featuring Backbone branding.

In November 2021, Backbone and Twitch announced a partnership to integrate Twitch features within the Backbone+ service. IGDB, Twitch’s game database, is used with the Backbone platform to display richer content within the app. The announcement also revealed that players would have immediate access to Twitch streaming and viewing directly from the Backbone app.

References 

Companies based in Vancouver, Washington
American companies established in 2018
2018 establishments in Washington (state)
Technology companies of the United States
Technology companies established in 2018